MŠK Rimavská Sobota is a Slovak football team, based in the city of Rimavská Sobota.

Affiliated clubs
The following clubs are affiliated with MŠK Rimavská Sobota:
  Diósgyőri VTK (2018–)

Honours

Domestic 
 Slovak Second Division (1993–)
  Winners (1): 2003–04
  Runners-Up (1):2010–11

European competition history

Sponsorship

Notable players 
Had international caps for their respective countries. Players whose name is listed in bold represented their countries while playing for MŠK.
For full list, see here

 Martin Dobrotka 	
 Krisztián Németh 	
 Attila Pinte 	
 Jozef Pisár 	
 Pavol Sedlák
 Lukáš Tesák
 Patrik Czakó

Notable managers

  Antal Mally (1948)
  Ladislav Jurkemik (1997-98)
  František Vas (1998-1999)
  Vladimír Goffa (2002-2003)
  Mikuláš Komanický (2005-2007)
  Karol Praženica (2013-2014)
  Gergely Geri (2014-2016)
  Vladimír Goffa (2016)
  Csaba Csányi (2016-2017)
  Eugen Bari (2019)
  Tomáš Boháčik (2019-2021)
  Eugen Bari (01/2022 – present)

References

External links 
  
 
Fan website 

Football clubs in Slovakia
Association football clubs established in 1913
MSK Rimavska Sobota